Ahuas is a municipality in the Honduran department of Gracias a Dios.

It is served by Ahuas Airport.

Demographics
At the time of the 2013 Honduras census, Ahuas municipality had a population of 8,095. Of these, 94.46% were Indigenous (94.05% Miskito), 4.77% Mestizo, 0.42% Afro-Honduran or Black, 0.19% White and 0.16% others.

References

Municipalities of the Gracias a Dios Department
Road-inaccessible communities of North America